Yassir Al-Taifi (born 10 May 1971) is a Saudi Arabian football defender who played for Saudi Arabia in the 1994 FIFA World Cup. He also played for Al-Riyadh.

References

1971 births
Saudi Arabian footballers
Saudi Arabia international footballers
Association football defenders
1994 FIFA World Cup players
Living people
Al-Riyadh SC players